Dağeteği is a village in the Yusufeli District, Artvin Province, Turkey. Its population is 100 (2021).

References

Villages in Yusufeli District